This is a comparison of USB TV tuner sticks.

DVB-T2 devices - General information 

This is a comparison of devices supporting the DVB-T2 standard.

See also 
 TV tuner card

References 
 Compare Hauppauge Freeview TV Tuners, Hauppauge official
 Hauppauge WinTV-dualHD Tuner Review (US version, not DVB-T), Stephen Lovely at cordcutting.com, Last modified: January 2, 2020
 The Best USB TV Tuner for PCs, NVIDIA Shield TV, Xbox One, Jim Kimble at cordcuttingreport.com, October 17, 2019

Computing input devices
 
Television technology
Television time shifting technology
Computing comparisons